UACH may refer to:
Austral University of Chile, Chilean research university
Autonomous University of Chihuahua, Mexican public university
Chapingo Autonomous University, Mexican agricultural college

Disambiguation pages